Strange Holiday is a 1970 Australian television film directed by Mende Brown and starring Jaeme Hamilton.

Plot
Ten boys and a dog are shipwrecked on an island in the Pacific. After a storm they discover another boat has been shipwrecked on the island. They make friends with two of the survivors, a nurse and ship's carpenter, but discover there are three other survivors who are ruthless mutineers. The children manage to outwit the mutineers, the carpenter builds them a boat and they sail home.

Cast
Jaeme Hamilton as Briant
Mark Healey as Doniphan
Jaime Massang as Mocco
Van Alexander as Gordon
Ross Williams as Jacob
Simon Asprey as Iverson
Peter Alexander as Garnett
Michael Berry as Service
Mark Lee as Costar
Larry Crane as Wilcox
Carmen Duncan as nurse
Garry Pankhurst
Ben Gabriel
Mark Hertson
Goff Vockler
Tony Allan
Don McNiven
Nigel Lovell

Production
The film was financed by an American company seeking product for the US TV market and Artransa Film Studios. Shooting began in April 1969 in the Atransa Studios at Sydney and up the coast nearby. Production soon followed on another feature Little Jungle Boy (1970).

Reception
The movie returned a comfortable profit to its investors.

References

External links

Strange Holiday at Oz Movies

1970 television films
1970 films
Films based on French novels
Films based on works by Jules Verne
Films set on islands
Films about castaways
Films about survivors of seafaring accidents or incidents
Films set in Oceania
Australian television films
1970s English-language films
1970s Australian films